Keane may refer to:

Keane (band), an English band
Keane (company), an IT consulting firm based in Boston
Keane (surname), including a list of people with the name
Keane Mulready-Woods (died 2020), Irish male murder victim
The Keane Brothers, American duo, a.k.a. Keane
Keane (2004 film), a film by Lodge Kerrigan

See also
 Kean (disambiguation)